Michael Stübgen (born 17 October 1959) is a German politician of the Christian Democratic Union (CDU) who has been serving as State Minister of the Interior and for Local Affairs in the cabinet of Minister-President of Brandenburg Dietmar Woidke since 2019. He previously served as a member of the Bundestag from the state of Brandenburg from 1990 till 2019.

Political career

Member of the German Parliament, 1990–2019
Stübgen joined the CDU in 1990.

Stübgen was a member of the German Bundestag from 1990 to 2019, where he was deputy chairman of the Committee on European Union Affairs from 1994 to 1998. He was Chairman of the Brandenburg regional group in the CDU/CSU parliamentary group from 1998. From 2005 to 2018, Stübgen was also the European policy spokesman of the CDU/CSU parliamentary group in the Bundestag and chairman of the parliamentary group working group on European Union affairs. From October 2011 to March 2018, Stübgen was also a deputy member of the Budget Committee of the German Bundestag.

In the negotiations to form a coalition government of the Christian Democrats (CDU together with the Bavarian CSU) and the FDP following the 2009 federal elections, Stübgen was part of the CDU/CSU delegation in the working group on foreign affairs, defense, Europe and development policy, led by Franz Josef Jung and Werner Hoyer.

From 2018 to 2019, Stübgen served as Parliamentary State Secretary under minister Julia Klöckner at the Federal Ministry of Food and Agriculture.

Career in state government
Since 2019, Stübgen has been serving as chairman of the CDU in Brandenburg. Following the 2019 state elections, he was appointed State Minister of the Interior and for Local Affairs in Brandenburg on November 20, 2019.

In December 2022, Stübgen announced his intention to resign as chairman of the CDU in Brandenburg.

Other activities
 German Forum for Crime Prevention (DFK), Ex-Officio Member of the Board of Trustees (since 2020)

References

External links 

 Bundestag biography 

1959 births
Living people
Members of the Bundestag for Brandenburg
Members of the Bundestag 2017–2021
Members of the Bundestag 2013–2017
Members of the Bundestag 2009–2013
Members of the Bundestag 2005–2009
Members of the Bundestag 2002–2005
Members of the Bundestag 1998–2002
Members of the Bundestag 1994–1998
Members of the Bundestag 1990–1994
Ministers of the Brandenburg State Government
Members of the Bundestag for the Christian Democratic Union of Germany
Parliamentary State Secretaries of Germany